Bullskin Township is a township in Fayette County, Pennsylvania, United States. The population was 6,729 at the 2020 census, a decline from the figure of 6,966 tabulated in 2010. It is served by the Connellsville Area School District.

The settlements of Poplar Grove, Moyer, Prittstown, Pennsville, Bear Rocks, Breakneck, Hammondville, and Wooddale are all located within the township.

History
The Mount Vernon Furnace and Peter and Jonathan Newmyer Farm are listed on the National Register of Historic Places.

Geography
Bullskin Township is in northeastern Fayette County, bordered to the north by Westmoreland County.

U.S. Route 119 crosses the western side of the township, leading north to Greensburg and south to Connellsville. Pennsylvania Route 982 (Pleasant Valley Road) runs from US-119 north along the western base of Chestnut Ridge to Pennsylvania Route 31 at the township's northern boundary. PA 31 leads west to Mount Pleasant and east to Donegal.

Demographics

As of the census of 2000, there were 7,782 people, 3,023 households, and 2,279 families residing in the township.  The population density was 179.4 people per square mile (69.2/km2).  There were 3,206 housing units at an average density of 73.9/sq mi (28.5/km2).  The racial makeup of the township was 99.36% White, 0.05% African American, 0.09% Native American, 0.17% Asian, 0.04% Pacific Islander, 0.10% from other races, and 0.19% from two or more races. Hispanic or Latino of any race were 0.17% of the population.

There were 3,023 households, out of which 31.8% had children under the age of 18 living with them, 63.3% were married couples living together, 7.9% had a female householder with no husband present, and 24.6% were non-families. 21.3% of all households were made up of individuals, and 9.1% had someone living alone who was 65 years of age or older.  The average household size was 2.57 and the average family size was 2.98.

In the township the population was spread out, with 22.8% under the age of 18, 7.6% from 18 to 24, 30.1% from 25 to 44, 26.2% from 45 to 64, and 13.2% who were 65 years of age or older.  The median age was 39 years. For every 100 females, there were 102.8 males.  For every 100 females age 18 and over, there were 100.1 males.

The median income for a household in the township was $32,059, and the median income for a family was $40,259. Males had a median income of $32,133 versus $21,737 for females. The per capita income for the township was $16,719.  About 9.0% of families and 11.2% of the population were below the poverty line, including 11.6% of those under age 18 and 9.4% of those age 65 or over.

See also
Bullskin Township/Connellsville Township Joint Sewage Authority

References

External links
Bullskin Township Historical Society

Pittsburgh metropolitan area
Townships in Fayette County, Pennsylvania